Book one or book 1 can refer to:

Book One: Water, the first season of the animated television series Avatar: The Last Airbender
Book One: Air, the first season of the animated television series The Legend of Korra
 "Book One," a colloquial term for the self-help book Dianetics: The Modern Science of Mental Health by L. Ron Hubbard
 Book 1, upcoming studio album by Grimes